The Scion xB is a compact car (subcompact car in its first generation) made by Scion, a now-defunct fully owned division of Toyota, for the United States market. It is a box-shaped, 5-door hatchback.

First generation (XP30; 2003)

The first-generation xB was a lightly modified and rebadged version of the Japanese-market subcompact Toyota bB. It was a small hatchback based on the Toyota Echo/Yaris platform. The xB was one of two models in the lineup of Toyota's US-exclusive Scion division present at the brand's 2003 launch, the other being the xA, based on the Toyota ist. The car proved to be unexpectedly popular with senior drivers.

First-generation xB vs. first-generation bB
Only the first-generation models for both the xB and bB are related. Second-generation models are based upon different platforms.

To create the first-generation xB, the bB was modified from right- to left-hand drive, the front passenger area was also changed significantly with the bB's front bench seat replaced with bucket seats and the column-mounted shifter changed to a floor-mounted shifter.

The available drivetrains also differed. The bB was available with either the 1.3 L I4 2NZ-FE engine or the 1.5 L 1NZ-FE, mated exclusively to a 4-speed automatic transmission with available all wheel drive. All-wheel drive was not offered on the xB.

The Toyota bB was equipped with a compact spare tire under the floor of the luggage area. On the Scion xB, a compact spare tire was stored under the left side of a raised rear cargo floor.  Since the spare tire raised the cargo floor by several inches, a storage bin was added to the right of the spare tire to reclaim some of the lost storage space. A jack was stored under the driver's seat of the xB.

The Toyota bB had a pull-out storage tray under the passenger seat that the xB lacks.

The bB went on sale in February 2000, whereas the xB went on sale in June 2003 for the 2004 model year. Sales of the first-generation bB ended in December 2005, whereas the first-generation xB ended sales in June 2007.

Scion t2B (2005)

Scion t2B (Tall-Two Box) is a concept hatchback designed by Calty Design Research and built by Five Axis Models in Huntington Beach, California, with interior design by Calty senior designer Bill Chergosky and Naoki Hamajima. The 5-door hatchback included a 2.4-liter I4 engine, 4-speed automatic transmission, 14-inch brakes with slotted rotors, 20-inch billet aluminium wheels, LED fog lamp, remotely operated power rear hatch, asymmetrical tri-level instrument panel features a large information ticker, MP3 docking station, dual moonroof, half-length suicide doors.

The vehicle was unveiled at the 2005 New York Auto Show.

Release Series vehicles

The xB, like the xA and tC, was also available in a "Release Series" for each of its model years. These came with limited-edition paint colors, matching seat colors, and special modifications such as DVD players, custom tail lights, special wheels or wheel covers, and other accessories, to make the RS different from the others. All Scion RS' receive special badges indicating the serial number. Limited Edition vehicles were, from a marketing standpoint, used to create a buzz for the brand name, with their exterior colors tending toward loud or bright hues (i.e. orange, yellow, red, blue, green).  Preordering is available at each dealership on a first-come, first-served basis. Scion's "Pure Price" program requires dealerships to sell the vehicle at the advertised price. Resale values of Release Series vehicles command a premium because of their packaged options and scarcity.

2004 model year

 xB RS 1.0 only available in Hot Lava Orange with 2100 units produced (504 units w/5spd, 1596 units w/automatic)
The xB Release Series 1.0 comes with some unique features from the factory which include Hot Lava paint, color-keyed rear spoiler, matching orange powder-coated strut tie-bar, custom grill, color tuned interior and under-seat & dash orange illumination.

2005 model year

 xB RS 2.0 only available in Solar Yellow with 2500 units produced
This RS edition came with color keyed side mirror overlays with LED turn signals, rear spoiler, tunable stainless steel sport muffler, and a metal mesh grille. Inside there are stainless appliqués on the door sills, and yellow upholstery accents to match the exterior, and a plaque that shows the build number xxxx/2500. The RS 2.0 added $1,375 to the MSRP.

2006 model year

 xB RS 3.0 only available in Envy Green with 2200 units produced
RS 3.0 changes include Envy Green paint, seven-spoke wheel coverings, and rear spoiler. Standard features include Alpine DVD audio/video system; iPod connectivity; headrest entertainment system; and a radar intrusion sensor. Each of the 2,200 vehicles have their own numbered badging. The RS 3.0 added $2,310 to the MSRP price.

 xB RS 4.0 only available in a Torched Penny called Maziora, a line of polarized paints made by Japan's Nippon Paint Co. is a (polarized goldish-brown) with 2500 units produced. The Release Series 4.0 is painted in a 3-part Maziora Torched Penny paint, which is a color-shifting finish that changes depending on the viewing angle and/or how light plays off the car's surface. In this case, the colors morph into shades of brown, bronze, and gold. In addition to the deluxe paint, the RS 4.0 received a rear spoiler, Modellista grille, and rear bumper protector and everything is color-keyed. Inside, the floor mats are embroidered reading "Release Series". It also got multicolor dash lighting, a new shift knob and a numbered plaque xxxx/2500.

Safety
The first generation received a "Good" overall score in the frontal offset test, all measured categories in this test were also rated "Good".  The xB was given a "Poor" overall score in the side impact test. The xB model year 2003–2006 did not offer side airbags but includes them for model year 2008–2015.

Second generation (E150; 2007)

The second-generation Scion xB is styled as a 5-door hatchback of the t2B concept. Toyota unveiled the production xB at the 2007 Chicago Auto Show. The new xB was rounder in shape and larger than its predecessor. The 2008 model year xB is  wider,  longer - including  longer wheel to wheel - and  heavier than the first-generation xB.

The first-generation Scion xB was based on the original Toyota bB and it's Yaris platform, but the second-generation xB was now based on the new Corolla's platform. Design changes were said to be based on American buyers' "wants" relative to the first-generation.

The Scion xB was produced by Kanto Auto Works, Ltd. based in Japan.  Due to the 2011 Japanese earthquake, production was suspended from 14 March 2011 to 18 April 2011, affecting several Toyota vehicles, including the Scion xB and Scion xD.  Plants affected by the disaster included the Toyota Motor Hokkaido Plant, the Toyota Motor Tohoku Plant, and the Central Motor Corporation Miyagi Plant, which produces the Toyota Yaris.

A five-speed manual and a sequential-shift four-speed automatic are the only factory options aside from the color and stereo.

A choice of three new head units is available on all 2008 Scions. All sound systems feature six speakers and standard iPod connectivity. The base head unit has MP3, WMA, and AAC CD compatibility and Scion's SSP equalizer presets. The base unit can also be set to any of three Scion model presets (xB, xD, or tC) and includes an "Automatic Sound Levelizer" feature that automatically increases the volume as the vehicle speed and ambient noise increases. The Premium head unit features a small LCD that can display pictures and movies downloaded from Pioneer's website in addition to the features on the base unit. A navigation system is also available. The SNS 100 system can play DVD movies in addition to GPS functionality and the features of the base system, aside from the backlit color choices.

All xBs come standard with four-wheel anti-lock brakes, brake assist, electronic brakeforce distribution, Vehicle Stability Control driver and front passenger dual stage airbags, front seat-mounted side torso airbags, front and rear side curtain airbags, and a first-aid kit.

In 2013, the xB was chosen by cars.com as a Top 10 Best Base Model.

Model year changes
Scion announced in March 2010 that the 2011 model, on sale late March 2010, is being given a refresh. Two new colors are available, and there are minor changes to the exterior body, including a revised front and rear bumper, new front grille, and new headlights and tail lights. The interior changes include a revised gauge cluster, center console and new driver and front passenger seats with new materials. In addition, the Scion xB went on sale in Canada for the first time along with the entire Scion lineup. In 2011, for the 2012 model year, a new radio with bluetooth became standard.

For the 2013 model year, Scion made a few enhancements including remodeled front and rear bumpers and a few interior upgrades including the optional BeSpoke radio. New colors are Absolutely Red and Nautical Blue Metallic (Absolutely Red was available in 2009 as RS 6.0). Stingray Metallic and Elusive Blue Metallic colors were dropped (Stingray Metallic was a very expensive color and Toyota no longer offers it on any model). Sales of the 2013 model began in February 2013.

Sales for the 2014 model began in December 2013. No major changes for this model year. All models now come with a standard Scion 6.1-inch display touch screen audio system. Sales for the 2015 model began in December 2014. For the new model year, Scion added a standard backup camera to the xB as well as continuing the updates for 2014.

The Scion xB, along with the Toyota Matrix, was replaced by the second generation Toyota Auris-based Scion iM, which launched in April 2015 for the 2016 model year. Due to the discontinuation of the Scion marque, the Scion iM was re-branded as the Toyota Corolla iM for the 2017 model year. The equivalent Australian-market Toyota Rukus was discontinued in October 2015 and the Japanese-market Toyota Corolla Rumion was discontinued in December 2015.

Safety
The second-generation Scion xB has won the Top Safety Pick award by the Insurance Institute for Highway Safety (IIHS) for six years in a row. It received an overall "Good" score in the Insurance Institute for Highway Safety frontal offset crash test, and another "Good" overall score in the side impact crash test, with all nine measured categories also rated "Good". And a "Good" score in the roof strength test.

Awards
Car and Driver magazine rated the 2008 xB as one of the top ten safe vehicles under .

Release Series vehicles

2008 model year

 xB RS 5.0 only available in Gold Rush Mica with 2500 units produced (second RS Scion other than the tC to have a sunroof)

2009 model year
 xB RS 6.0 only available in Absolutely Red with 2500 units produced The RS 6.0 added $1,743 to the MSRP.

2010 model year
 xB RS 7.0 with a four-piece DAMD body kit, only available in Murasaki (Purple), with 2000 units produced The RS 7.0 added $3000 to the base MSRP.

2011 model year
 xB RS 8.0 with a four-piece Kenstyle body kit and sunroof, only available in Voodoo Blue, with 2000 units produced The RS 8.0 added $2,405 to the MSRP.

2012 model year
 xB RS 9.0 only available in Hot Lava with 1500 units produced. The RS 9.0 added $1,810 to the MSRP.

2013 model year
 xB 10 Series only available in Silver Ignition with 2100 units produced. Scion 10 Series models were built to celebrate the 10th anniversary of the Scion brand. The xB model includes unique Silver Ignition exterior color, illuminating exterior Scion badges (front and rear), Pioneer touch screen audio system, solar-charged illuminating shift knob, individually numbered interior badge, graphite finish 16" alloy wheels, and jack-knife keys. The 10 Series added $2,410 to the MSRP.

2014 model year
 xB RS 10.0 only available in Electric Quartz with 1500 units produced. Equipped with green Scion logo projection on the rear bumper, green Release Series logo and matching number projected on the front floor mats, wireless charging bin, green interior pattern, backup camera, Piano Black inserts and Tungsten wheel covers.

Scion RIDE
It is a 1:18 Ridemakerz model based on the second-generation Scion xB. The body was available in Cannonball Black, Comet Blue and Wasabi Green.

The 7:8 full-sized concept and the toy were unveiled at the 2007 SEMA Show.

Toyota Corolla Rumion (E150N, 2007–2015)

A differently styled version for the Japanese market.

Toyota Rukus (2010–2015)
A differently styled version for the Australian market, with the 2.4l 2AZ-FE engine and a four-speed automatic gearbox, released June 2010.

Electric vehicles
AC Propulsion has produced an electric version of the first-generation xB called the eBox.

Researchers at Carnegie Mellon University's Robotics Institute have converted a Scion xB into a commuter electric vehicle as part of their ChargeCar research project.

Scion marketing
The Scion xB's marketing is aimed at Generation Y, Americans born between 1980 and 1994.  This group of car buyers is extremely important to manufacturers due to their large numbers (78 million) and their differing perceptions and demands of the vehicles they drive. Despite the Scion xB's target market, the average age of an xB buyer is 46.

Although Toyota expected the xA to sell better than the xB, the reverse proved to be true, with the xB outselling its sibling 2 to 1.

Sales
The Scion xB was Scion's most popular model in the United States until 2011, when it was surpassed by the tC. In the U.S., sales of the xB have been dropping after the introduction of the second generation, from a peak of over 60,000 to 17,017 in 2011.

Chinese copy
In 2009, Great Wall Motor of China released the Coolbear, which is a copy of the first-generation xB, but with a different front end.

See also
 AC Propulsion eBox

References

External links

xB
Front-wheel-drive vehicles
Subcompact cars
Compact cars
Hatchbacks
2010s cars
Cars introduced in 2003